Das Deutsche Mädel (The German Girl) was the Nazi propaganda magazine aimed at girls, particularly members of League of German Girls. In fact, it was the official organ of the League. The magazine was  published on a monthly basis between 1933 and 1942.

Unlike the adventure orientation of Der Pimpf, intended for Hitler Youth, Das deutsche Mädel urged hiking, tending the wounded, hard work in factories, and preparing for motherhood.  On the other hand, in contrast to the woman's magazine with some propaganda, NS-Frauen-Warte, it placed far more emphasis on the strong and active German woman; health, education, service, and sports all featured, and famous women depicted included doctors, athletes, poets, and pilots.

Articles in it included describing a speech by Jutta Rüdiger when she was appointed to lead The League of German Girls, telling the girls who had just joined the Jungmädelbund of their duties to Germany, and a story of how Young Girls had ensured that a dead father's promise to his son was fulfilled.

References

External links
Material from "Das deutsche Mädel"

1933 establishments in Germany
1942 disestablishments in Germany
Defunct magazines published in Germany
German-language magazines
Magazines established in 1933
Magazines disestablished in 1942
Monthly magazines published in Germany
Nazi propaganda organizations
Propaganda newspapers and magazines
Women in Nazi Germany
Women's magazines published in Germany